Nicolò Cambiaghi (born 28 December 2000) is an Italian professional footballer who plays as a forward for  club Empoli, on loan from Atalanta.

Career
On 15 July 2021, he joined Serie B club Pordenone on a season-long loan. He appeared in a total of 37 matches, scoring seven goals.

Cambiaghi joined Serie A club Empoli on a season-long dry loan on 4 August 2022.

References

External links

Living people
2000 births
Sportspeople from Monza
Italian footballers
Footballers from Lombardy
Association football midfielders
Serie A players
Serie B players
Atalanta B.C. players
A.C. Reggiana 1919 players
Pordenone Calcio players
Empoli F.C. players